The Interlachen Country Club is a private country club in Edina, Minnesota which has hosted several national golf tournaments, including the 1930 U.S. Open (won by Bobby Jones on his way to winning the Grand Slam), the 2002 Solheim Cup, and the 2008 U.S. Women's Open.

History
Interlachen's history dates from November 16, 1909, when several members of the Bryn Mawr Golf Club decided to found a new golf club and purchased farmland alongside a suburban Minneapolis streetcar line.  The club was officially incorporated on December 31, and the original golf course was opened on July 29, 1911.  It was a nine-hole course, and was designed by Willie Watson, a well-known course architect of the time.  George Sargent, who won the 1909 U.S. Open and was later president of the PGA of America, was the head professional for a few years.

In 1919, the club decided to redesign the course.  The new 18-hole course, which is largely the same today, was designed by Donald Ross and opened in 1921.  Robert Trent Jones made some alterations in 1963, and Geoffrey Cornish renovated it in 1986.  The course is consistently ranked Golf Digest's list of the 100 best courses in the United States (#44 in 2005, #62 in 2007), and #1 in Minnesota.  The course is about 6,900 yards long, and is a par 72.

The first major tournament held at Interlachen was the Western Open in 1914.  In July 1930, the club was the site of the U.S. Open championship.  Bobby Jones had already won the British Amateur and the British Open that year, and continued his run by winning at Interlachen by two strokes over Macdonald Smith.  Jones completed 
his unprecedented Grand Slam by winning the U.S. Amateur later in the year.  The club was scheduled to host the 1942 U.S. Open, but the event was cancelled after the outbreak of World War II.

The club also hosted the 1935 U.S. Women's Amateur Championship, which was won by Glenna Collett Vare 3 & 2 over Patty Berg.  Berg was a 17-year-old member of Interlachen, and was playing in her first national tournament.  She went on to an illustrious amateur and professional career, and was a founding member of the Ladies Professional Golf Association (LPGA).

The 2002 Solheim Cup was held at Interlachen, with the United States retaking the cup by a score of 15½ to 12½.  Europe was ahead 9-7 heading into the last day, but the U.S. staged a comeback in the singles matches for the narrow win.

Inbee Park won the U.S. Women's Open at Interlachen on June 29, 2008.

Course

Back tees

Tournaments
1914 Western Open, won by Jim Barnes
1916 Trans-Mississippi Amateur, won by Harry Legg
1930 U.S. Open, won by Bobby Jones
1935 U.S. Women's Amateur, won by Glenna Collett Vare
1986 U.S. Senior Amateur, won by R.S. Williams
1993 Walker Cup, won by the United States over Great Britain & Ireland, 19-5
2002 Solheim Cup, won by the United States over Europe, 15½-12½
2008 U.S. Women's Open, won by Inbee Park
2016 Junior Ryder Cup, won by team USA 15½-8½

References

External links
Official site

Golf clubs and courses in Minnesota
Golf clubs and courses designed by Donald Ross
Solheim Cup venues
Walker Cup venues
Sports venues in Minnesota
Buildings and structures in Edina, Minnesota
1911 establishments in Minnesota
Sports venues completed in 1911